Guided democracy, also called managed democracy, is a formally democratic government that functions as a de facto authoritarian government or in some cases, as an autocratic government. Such hybrid regimes are legitimized by elections that are free and fair, but do not change the state's policies, motives, and goals.
The concept is also related to semi-democracy or anocracy.

In other words, the government controls elections so that the people can exercise all their rights without truly changing public policy. While they follow basic democratic principles, there can be major deviations towards authoritarianism. Under managed democracy, the state's continuous use of propaganda techniques prevents the electorate from having a significant impact on policy.

After World War II, the term was used in Indonesia for the approach to government under the Sukarno administration from 1959 to 1966. It is today widely employed in Russia, where it was introduced into common practice by Kremlin theorists, in particular Gleb Pavlovsky.

The Sanacja regime that governed interwar Poland from 1926 to 1939 is considered an example of guided democracy. The regime retained much of the structures and institutions of Polish parliamentary democracy, even though Józef Piłsudski exercised such large influence on the government that he "assumed some of the postures of a dictator". The opposition sat in the parliament and local governments, and political parties were allowed to function legally. Polish historian  notes that elections under Piłsudski's regime were still organised along the principles of parliamentary democracy, and the Sanacja regime was genuinely popular as the opposition parties were blamed for failing to prevent the Great Depression. While the actions of the opposition were hampered, repressions were rare and only two parties were banned: Camp of Great Poland and National Radical Camp.

See also 

 Authoritarian democracy
 Conservative democracy
 Dominant-party system
 Enlightened absolutism
 Ethnic democracy
 Herrenvolk democracy
 Illiberal democracy
 Totalitarian democracy
 Dictablanda
 Sovereign democracy
 Totalitarian democracy
 Types of democracy

References

External links 
 Managed Democracy (July 8, 2005, The Moscow Times article discussing the managed democracy in Russia)

Mixed government
Propaganda
Types of democracy